Innerstanding is the second studio album by English-Irish singer Maverick Sabre. The album was released on 30 October 2015 via Mercury Records 
Two singles preceded its release, "Walk Into The Sun" (28 June 2015) and "Come Fly Away" (23 October 2015). The album debuted at Forty One on the UK Albums Chart and Seventy Three on the Irish Albums Chart.

Track listing

Charts

References

2015 albums
Maverick Sabre albums